Jan Franciszek Wątroba (born 4 December 1953, in Wieluń) is the current Roman Catholic bishop of  Rzeszów, in Poland.

He was Ordained Priest in Częstochowa in 1979.

See also
Roman Catholic Diocese of Rzeszów#Leadership

References

1953 births
Living people
21st-century Roman Catholic bishops in Poland
People from Wieluń